Extreme cold may refer to:

 Extreme cold weather
 Absolute zero, the lowest limit of the thermodynamic temperature scale
 Temperatures used in flash freezing
 Temperatures used in cryogenics

See also
 Freezing
 Lowest temperature recorded on Earth